Elgin Fairlawn, Kolkata (formerly known as Fairlawn Hotel) was built around 1783. It is located on Sudder Street of Kolkata. Initially built as a house, it was later turned into a hotel in 1936.

Background

The colonial bungalow was built in 1783 by an Englishman William Ford, when Warren Hastings was the Governor General. The house on Sudder Street became a hotel in 1936 after passing into the hands of Mrs. Rose Smith (née Sarkies) of Armenian roots. In 2018, the hotel was bought by Elgin Hotels & Resorts.

History
Indian film actor Shashi Kapoor met his wife Jennifer Kendal in the hotel. The couple returned to the hotel after they got married in 1958 for their honeymoon. Shashi Kapoor liked spending time in the hotel, specially in the Room No. 17 — which later on became known as the Shashi Kapoor Room.

Felicity Kendal, the British actress and also the sister of Jennifer Kendal has spent some time with her family in the hotel. She wrote in 2012 - "I loved it here, and it is from this hotel that I left, aged 17, to try my luck in England, my father’s disapproval ringing in my ears."

The hotel has been a host to Eric Newby, a travel writer. Another notable guest was the French Writer Dominique Lapierre who stayed here while writing the story about Calcutta titled City of Joy published in 1985. This was made into a film in 1992 and the cast and crew of the film, including Patrick Swayze has also stayed here. Ismail Merchant and James Ivory, whose 1965 film Shakespeare Wallah was loosely based on and starred the Kendals also has been the guests at this hotel.

References

External links 
 https://www.fairlawnhotel.com
 https://www.elginhotels.com

Hotels in Kolkata
Heritage hotels in India